Titusvillia is an extinct genus of colonial glass sponges that existed during the carboniferous period around 300 million years ago. It is represented by a single species, Titusvillia drakei.

Taxonomy
It is uncertain if taxa in the clade Silicarea are a separate phylum, or contained within the phylum Porifera.

References 

Hexactinellida genera
Prehistoric sponge genera
Carboniferous invertebrates
Devonian animals of North America